(born April 18, 1982 in Amagasaki, Hyōgo) is a Japanese freestyle swimmer.

He is married to former swimmer Aya Terakawa.

Personal bests
In long course:
 50m freestyle: 23.08 (October 2, 2006)
 100m freestyle: 49.86 (April 1, 2007)
 200m freestyle: 1:49.22 (August 23, 2007)

References

Sources
 https://web.archive.org/web/20080927044414/http://www.tv-asahi.co.jp/w-swim2007/pc/players/0002.html

External links
 Daisuke's Official Blog

1982 births
Japanese male freestyle swimmers
Sportspeople from Amagasaki
Living people
World Aquatics Championships medalists in swimming
Asian Games medalists in swimming
Swimmers at the 2002 Asian Games
Swimmers at the 2006 Asian Games
Asian Games gold medalists for Japan
Asian Games silver medalists for Japan
Asian Games bronze medalists for Japan
Medalists at the 2002 Asian Games
Medalists at the 2006 Asian Games
Universiade medalists in swimming
Universiade silver medalists for Japan
Medalists at the 2005 Summer Universiade
20th-century Japanese people
21st-century Japanese people